The 2000 Iceland earthquakes struck southern Iceland on June 17 and 21. There were no fatalities but three people suffered minor injuries and there was considerable damage to infrastructure. The two earthquakes were the first major seismic activity in Iceland for 88 years. The recorded magnitude of both of the main quakes was 6.5 .

Tectonic setting
Iceland lies on the spreading axis of the Mid-Atlantic Ridge (MAR) where it is influenced by the Iceland hotspot, a major mantle upwelling. The active spreading axis of the MAR is moving westward with respect to the hotspot. This means that the active rifts above the hotspot have progressively jumped towards the east, causing the development of two major transform zones in the north and south of the island. To the south the zone is the South Iceland Seismic Zone (SISZ), which has a west–east trend and is about 20 km wide. Most earthquakes in this zone are associated with movement on north–south trending right lateral strike-slip faults, although there is also evidence of WSW–ENE trending faults.

According to historical records, there have been 33 damaging earthquakes in the SISZ from the 11th century up to June 2000, with the latest  being in 1896 and 1912.

Earthquakes
The first of the earthquakes occurred at 15:40 UTC on 17 June at a depth of 6.3 km. The magnitude estimated by the Icelandic Meteorological Office was 6.4 , assuming a single fault, although such a model did not fit all the available data. The extent of aftershocks defined a 16 km long north-south fault rupture, continuing down to 10 km. The causative fault was the Árnes Fault and a large number of surface fissures were mapped along this structure in the days following the event.

The second earthquake occurred at 00:51 UTC on 21 June at a depth of 5.1 km. The extent of aftershocks defined an 18 km fault rupture down to 8 km depth. The causative fault was the Hestfjall Fault. Surface fissures were developed over a distance of about 25 km.

See also 
 Geology of Iceland
 List of earthquakes in 2000
 List of earthquakes in Iceland

References

External links 

Iceland
Earthquakes in Iceland
Earthquake
June 2000 events in Europe
Earthquake clusters, swarms, and sequences